Tasmyn Benny (born 20 October 1998) is a boxer from New Zealand. In 2018 she competed in boxing at the Commonwealth Games on the Gold Coast, Australia, winning a bronze medal. As of March 2018 she is the top ranked 48kg Elite Female boxer in New Zealand, and seventh ranked in the Commonwealth.

Benny is from Thames, in the North Island of New Zealand. She is of Ngāti Porou, Ngāpuhi and Waikato Tainui descent. She attended Turua Primary School before Hauraki Plains College, and joined the Royal New Zealand Navy after completing high school. Benny played netball as a teenager, and started boxing to get fit for games, however she enjoyed boxing so much she gave up netball to focus on boxing. Her first competitive fight was at the age of 16.

Awards and recognitions
2019 Gladrap Boxing Awards Amateur of the year (Nominated)

References

Living people
1998 births
Ngāti Porou people
Waikato Tainui people
Ngāpuhi people
New Zealand Māori sportspeople
Sportspeople from Thames, New Zealand
New Zealand women boxers
Boxers at the 2018 Commonwealth Games
Commonwealth Games medallists in boxing
Commonwealth Games bronze medallists for New Zealand
Light-flyweight boxers
21st-century New Zealand people
Medallists at the 2018 Commonwealth Games